Southwyck Mall was a shopping mall in southern Toledo, Ohio. After the final anchor (Dillard's) left, along with most of the inline stores, the mall closed on June 29, 2008.

History
The mall first opened in August 1972 by Kansas City developers Frank Morgan and Sherman Dreiseszun and had many stores, including Lion Store, Montgomery Ward, and Lamson's. For a time in the late 1970s through the early 1980s, Southwyck had a section called "Old Towne".  Accessible via a narrow themed walkway from the regular mall, Old Towne was a common area with cobblestone streets and at least 30 smaller retailers, plus a few novelty arcade machines and a "play tic-tac-toe with the chicken" machine.  Old Towne would eventually close, and the space converted to an additional three cinema screens by AMC (the mall originally opened with a seven-plex, the world's first, according to AMC literature at the time).  AMC also operated another multiplex cinemas in the mall with 8 screens.  Both theaters were eventually sold by AMC to National Amusements in 1995, and later closed.

The mall closed its doors after 36 years of business on June 29, 2008 and by November 1, 2009, the Southwyck Mall was completely demolished; the last structure to be demolished being the Montgomery Ward automobile service center.

From Lion's to Dillard's
When Lamson's closed in the mid-1970s, Lion converted that store into a "Lion's for the Home", with the other store focusing on fashion.  When The Lion Store was acquired by Dillard's, the two stores became a Dillard's department store and a Dillard's Home Store. Montgomery Ward closed in 2001 and remained vacant. More recently, Dillard's closed its home store in the mall. Diamond's Men Shops, the last original tenant in the mall, has since moved its shop into a strip mall across Reynolds Road, not far from Southwyck. In October 2007, Dillards moved to The Shops at Fallen Timbers.

After the mall closed, plans were made to demolish it for an outdoor shopping center.

References

External links
 The Village at Southwyck, by Dillin Corp.
 Developer Provides Update on Southwyck Redevelopment WNWO.com
 Stautzenberger College to become tenant at Southwyck 'village' Toledo Free Press website
 Southwyck Closing 13ABC.com

Shopping malls in the Toledo, Ohio metro area
Shopping malls established in 1972
Shopping malls disestablished in 2008
2008 disestablishments in Ohio
Demolished shopping malls in the United States
Buildings and structures in Toledo, Ohio
Buildings and structures demolished in 2009
1972 establishments in Ohio